Jahanpanah was the fourth medieval city of Delhi established in 1326–1327 by Muhammad bin Tughlaq (1325–51), of the Delhi Sultanate. To address the constant threat of the Mongols, Tughlaq built the fortified city of Jahanpanah (meaning in Persian: "Refuge of the World") subsuming the Adilabad fort that had been built in the 14th century and also all the establishments lying between Qila Rai Pithora and Siri Fort. Neither the city nor the fort has survived. Many reasons have been offered for such a situation. One of which is stated as the idiosyncratic rule of Mohammed bin Tughlaq when inexplicably he shifted the capital to Daulatabad in the Deccan and came back to Delhi soon after.

The ruins of the city's walls are even now discerned in the road between Siri to Qutub Minar and also in isolated patches behind the Indian Institute of Technology (IIT), in Begumpur, Khirki Masjid near Khirki village, Satpula and many other nearby locations; at some sections, as seen at Satpula, the fort walls were large enough to have few inbuilt storerooms to stack provisions and armory. The mystery of the city's precincts (complex) has unfolded over the years with later day excavations revealing a large number of monuments in the villages and colonies of South Delhi. Due to the compulsions of urban expansion of the Capital City of Delhi, Jahanpanah is now part of the upscale urban development of South Delhi. The village and the wealth of ruins scattered all around are now enclosed by South Delhi suburbs of Panchshil Park South, Malviya Nagar, Adchini, the Aurobindo Ashram, Delhi branch and other smaller housing colony developments. It is hemmed in the North–South direction between the Outer Ring Road and the Qutb Complex and on the east–west direction by the Mehrauli road and the Chirag Delhi road, with Indian Institute of Technology located on the other side of the Mehrauli road as an important landmark.

Etymology
Jahanpanah's etymology consists of two Persian words, جهان ‘Jahan’, "the world", and پناه ‘panah’,"shelter", thus "Refuge of the World"

History
Mohammed bin Tughlaq, son of Ghiyasuddin Tughlaq who built Tughlaqabad, constructed his new city of Jahanpanah between 1326 and 1327 by encircling the earlier cities of  Siri and Lal Kot with 13 gates. But what remains of the city and Adilabad fort are large ruins, which leave much ambiguity and conjectures regarding its physical status as to why and when it was built by Tughlaq.  Some of the structures which have survived partially are the Bijay Mandal (that is inferred to have housed the Hazar Sutan Palace, now destroyed), Begumpur Mosque, Serai Shaji Mahal, Lal Gumbad, Baradari with other nearby structures and scattered swathes of rubble masonry walls. From Ibn Batuta’s chronicle of the period (he lived in Delhi from 1333–41) it is inferred that Lal Kot (Qutb complex) was then the urban area, Siri was the military cantonment and the remaining area consisted of his palace (Bijaymandal) and other structures like mosques, etc.

Ibn Batuta has reasoned that Muhammad Shah wished to see a unified city comprising Lal Kot, Siri, Jahanpanah and Tughlaqabad with one contiguous fortification encompassing them but cost considerations forced him to abandon the plan halfway. In his chronicle, Batuta also stated that the Hazar Sutan Palace (1000 pillared palace), built outside the Siri fort limits but within the Jahanpanah City area, was the residence of the Tughlaq.

Hazar Sutan Palace was located within the fortified area of the Jahnapanah in Bijaya Mandal (literal meaning in  Hindi: 'victory platform'). The grand palace with its audience hall of the beautifully painted wooden canopy and columns is vividly described but it does no longer exists. The Fort acted as a safe haven for the people living between Qila Rai Pithora and Siri. Tughalqabad continued to act as Tughlaq’s centre of government until, for strange and inexplicable reasons, he shifted his capital to Daulatabad, however, he returned after a short period.

Adilabad 

Adilabad, a fort of modest size, built on the hills to the south of Tughlaqabad was provided with protective massive ramparts on its boundary around the city of Jahanpanah. The fort was much smaller than its predecessor fort, Tughlaqabad fort, but of similar design. Archaeological Survey of India (ASI) in its evaluation of the status of the fort for conservation has recorded that two gates, one with barbicans between two bastions on the south-east and another on the south-west. Inside, it, separated by a bailey, is a citadel consisting of walls, bastions and gates within which lay the palaces.

The fort was also known as ‘Muhammadabad’, but inferred as a latter-day development. The two gates on the southeast and southwest of Adilabad fort had chambers at the lower level while the east and west gates had grain bins and courtyards at the upper floors.

Tughlaq's primary attention to infrastructure, particularly of iron supply to the city, was also well thought out. A structure (weir or tank) with seven sluices (Hindi:Satpula, meaning "seven bridges") was built on a stream that flowed through the city. This structure called the Satpula is still existing (though non–functional) near Khirki village on the boundary walls of Jahanpanah.  Similar structures had also been built at Tughlaqabad and Delhi in Hauz Khas Complex, thus covering the water supply needs of entire population of Jahanpanah.
 Khirki Mosque lies in Khirki village.

Begampur Mosque 
Now, remnants of the city lie scattered in Begumpur village, as a mute reminder of its ancient glory. A majestic building in the heart of the city with pride of place played a pivotal role in serving as a madrasa, an administrative centre with the treasury and a mosque of large proportions serving as a social community hub surrounded by a market area. It has an unusual layout with three arches covered passages with a "three by eight" deep nine-bay prayer hall on the west. The construction of this mosque is credited to two sources. One view is that it was built by Khan-i-Jahan Maqbul Tilangani, prime minister during Feroz Shah Tughlaq’s rule, who was also a builder of six more masjids (two of them in the close vicinity). The other view is that it was built by Tughlaq because of its proximity to Bijay Mandal and could probably be dated to 1351 A.D., the year Tughlaq died here. In support of the second view, it is said that Ibn Batuta, the chronicler of the period (till his departure from Delhi in 1341 A.D.) had not recorded this monument. The Mosque considered an architectural masterpiece (see pictures in the gallery) has three gates, one in each of the three covered passages, in north, east (main gate) and south. The west wall which has the mihrab, has Toghluqi-style tapering minarets flanking the central high opening covered by a big dome. The entire passageway of the west wall has twenty-five arched openings. The mihrab wall depicts five projections.

The prayer hall has modest decorative carvings but the columns and walls are bland. The eastern gate approach is from the road level up a flight of steps to negotiate the raised plinth on which this unique mosque has been built with a four-iwan layout. Stone chajjas or eaves can also be seen on all the four arcades. The northern entry with  raised entrance, probably linked the mosque to the Bijayamandal Palace.  The stucco plastering work on the mosque walls has lasted for centuries and even now shows some tiles fixed on them at a few locations. The mosque was under occupation during Jahanpanah's existence till the 17th century. In the later period, encroachers had occupied the mosque but were cleared by the Archaeological Survey of India (ASI) in 1921. A shuttered by lane entry from the north has been interpreted as an approach that was used by the womenfolk of the Sultan's family for attending prayers in the mosque.

Bijay Mandal 
Bijay Mandal is a building with a layout plan of x dimensions, with a well proportioned square dome. It cannot be categorized as a tower or a palace. It is a typical Toghlaqi structure with an octagonal plan built in rubble masonry (with massive battered sloping walls on east, west and southern directions) on a raised platform with doorways in each cardinal direction. The purpose of this unusual structure and the ruins of the Sar Dara Palace was described by  Ibn Battuta as the palace with multiple chambers and the large public audience hall as the famed Hazar Sutan Palace. It was also interpreted as serving as an observation tower to monitor the activities of his troops. The ambiance of the place presented it as a place to relax and enjoy the scenic view of the environs. The inclined path around the monument was a walkway leading to the apartments of the Sultan. Two large openings in the living rooms of the floor were inferred as leading to the vaults or the treasury. On the level platform, outside the building in front of the apartment rooms, small holes equally spaced are seen, which have been inferred to be holes used to fix wooden pillars to hold a temporary shamiana (pavilion) or cover. The process of ushering people into the presence of the Sultan was devious and formal involving entry through semi–public places to private chambers to the audience hall. The debate on whether the Hazara Sutan Palace cited as existing during Alauddin Khalji reign and also during Tughlaq's time are one and the same palace has not been conclusive. A plausible hypothesis is that the stone hall of the palace was built by Alauddin Khalji while the tower adjoining the stone buildings was surely built by Mohammed bin Tughlaq.

Archaeological excavations carried out by the Archaeological Survey of India unearthed treasures from the vaults in the buildings, which date the occupation of this monument during Feroz Shah's reign and also by Sheikh Hasan Tahir (a saint) during Sikander Lodi’s rule at the beginning of the 16th century. Also, excavations done in 1934 have revealed wooden pillar bases attributed to the Hazar Sutan Palace.
Within the close precincts of the Bijay Mandal, a domed building is seen which has a unique architectural façade of two openings on each of its three sides, interpreted as an annex to another building (based on underground passages seen in the adjoining structure). However, the purpose for which this dome was built is not known.
Kalusarai Masjid

At present, it is occupied as a residential complex by a few families. The Masjid was built by the famous builder of Mosques Khan-i-Jahan Maqbul Tilangani, Prime Minister during Feroz Shah Tughlaq's reign, as one of his seven mosques; built in the same architectural style as the other six built by him. But even now the visible decorations of the mihrab appear to be more intricate than in his other mosques. When built with rubble masonry and plastered, the mosque had seven arched openings as the frontage, three bays depth-wise and crowned by a sequence of low domes in typical Tughlaqi architectural style.

Serai Shaji Mahal 
Further to the east of Begumpur Masjid, in the Serai Shahji village, Mughal period buildings are seen of which the Serai Shaji Mahal is a distinguishing monument. The area surrounding this is scattered with decrepit gates, graves and a large slum area. A little distance from this place is the tomb of Shiekh Farid Murtaza Khan, who during Emperor Akbar’s period, was credited with building a number of Serai's, a mosque and Faridabad village, which is now the present–day large city in Haryana.

Other notable structures 
Other notable structures in the Jahanpanah's ambit of  area in close vicinity of the present day Panchshila Public School are the following :

The Lal Gumbad was built as a tomb for Shaikh Kabbiruddin Auliya (1397), a sufi saint who lived in the 14th century as a disciple of Sufi saint Shaikh Raushan Chiragh–i–Delhi. The dome tomb was built with red sandstone. It is considered to be a small size replica of the Ghiyasuddin Tughlaq’s Tomb in Tughlaqabad. The gateway to the tomb has a pointed arch with marble bands. It is also called the Rakabwala Gumbad because dacoits had stolen the finial on the roof of the tomb by climbing up over the iron rungs (called 'Rakab') on its western wall.  Apart from these structures, the four walls of a mosque also are within the compound wall of the tomb.

The Sadhana Enclave are features Baradari an arched hall. Thought to have been built in the 14th century or 15th century, it is in a fairly well-preserved condition. A Lodi period tomb is also seen nearby.
  
Further away from the Sadhana enclave on its opposite side, in Shiekh Serai, three tombs are noted of which only one is well preserved, the squared domed tomb of Sheikh  Alauddin (1541–42). The tomb building is raised on twelve columns with perforated screens on the façade has a large dome, creating a drum with sixteen faces. The ceiling of the tomb is well decorated with medallions in plaster on the spandrel of arches and within the parapets a merlon design.

Conservation measures
Archaeological excavations were done by ASI in part of the fort walls at its junction with the eastern wall of Qila Rai Pithora. The excavations revealed rough and small stones in the foundations followed by an ashlar face in the exterior wall above ground. The ASI is presently involved in conservation activities of the wall, providing railings, environmental improvements and lighting of the area, at a cost of Rs 15 lakhs (US$30,000).

Modern location
Jahanpanah's ruins are mostly concentrated in South Delhi in the present suburbs of Kalu Sarai, Bijaymandal, Adchini, Begumpur village, IIT, Delhi crossing, Aurobindo Marg, Malviya Nagar, Panchsheel Enclave South, Sadhana Enclave, Press Enclave Road, in the urban village of Chirag Delhi, Tuhghlaqabad and Qutub Minar. The ancient city walls are seen at a few locations, such as east of Khirki village near Satpula. The Outer Ring Road also crosses this road at IIT crossing. From this crossing, all the locations can be reached from the Aurobindo Marg diversion road next to the Essex Farms (opposite to IIT, Delhi).

Gallery

References

Archaeological monuments in Delhi
Architecture of the Tughlaq dynasty
Mosques in Delhi
Buildings and structures completed in the 14th century
1320s establishments in Asia
Archaeological sites in Delhi
14th-century establishments in India
Monuments of National Importance in Delhi